Modern Guilt is the eleventh studio album by American musician Beck, released in 2008 by both DGC Records and XL Recordings. The album was produced by Beck and Danger Mouse and features two contributions by Cat Power.

Production
Beck and Danger Mouse (Brian Burton) had been casual acquaintances prior to their collaboration on the album, as some of Beck's musicians had also performed with Danger Mouse's project Gnarls Barkley. Beck said, "It did help that we share a lot of musical references. We spent the first week just talking about different records. His knowledge is pretty deep, especially with some of the obscure late-Sixties, early-Seventies rock." 

The original concept for the album was 10 short tracks, each around two minutes long, but Beck eventually chose to eliminate the shorter tracks. Songs began with an acoustic guitar and drumbeat and selected songs would then be embellished upon, with Burton adding keyboard bass and Beck adding other instruments. Beck described the album as the most intensive work he'd ever done: "It was like trying to fit two years of songwriting into two and a half months. ... I know I did at least 10 weeks with no days off, until four or five in the morning every night."

At 33 minutes long, the album was Beck's shortest, with only two songs lasting longer than four minutes.

Release
In May 2008, it was announced that Beck would be releasing a then-untitled album in the summer. Modern Guilt was released on July 7, 2008 in the UK and Europe and on the following day in the United States. A vinyl record of the album, including download codes for the 320-kbit/s digital version of the album direct from the vinyl master, was released on July 22, 2008.

In July 2009, launching his website's new Videotheque section, Beck uploaded a series of videos comprising acoustic band performances of every song on the album, recorded earlier in the year after returning home from his tour of Japan.

Reception

Critical
The album received generally positive reviews upon release, earning a rating of 77 out of 100 on Metacritic. Filter said of the album, "Beck is somehow more aware while puffing out his waves of broken poetry as opposed to the casual seed-spitting he has been known to turn to", while AllMusic said that it was "an effective dosage of 21st century paranoia." Some negative reviews, such as one from PopMatters, said that the album "lacks the unique resonating timbres one is accustomed to with Beck", while The Guardian called it "a vanity project".

In December 2008, Modern Guilt was nominated for Best Alternative Album at the 51st Annual Grammy Awards, but it lost to In Rainbows by Radiohead.

Commercial
The album entered both the Billboard 200 and the Canadian Albums Chart at number four, and gave Beck his first ever Top 10 placing on the UK Albums Chart, peaking at number nine. The album was also Beck's second-best charting album in Australia, reaching number 13, behind his twelfth studio album Morning Phase, which debuted and peaked at number 5 in 2014. In the US, the album sold 84,000 copies in its first week. Although successful, it did not match the first week sales of Beck's previous album, The Information (2006), which were 99,000. In Canada, the album sold over 6,000 copies in its first week.

Modern Guilt was awarded a silver certification from the Independent Music Companies Association, which indicated sales of at least 30,000 copies throughout Europe.

Track listing
All songs written by Beck, except "Walls", written by Beck, Danger Mouse, Paul Guiot and Paul Piot.

"Orphans" – 3:15
"Gamma Ray" – 2:57
"Chemtrails" – 4:40
"Modern Guilt" – 3:14
"Youthless" – 3:00
"Walls" – 2:22
"Replica" – 3:25
"Soul of a Man" – 2:36
"Profanity Prayers" – 3:43
"Volcano" – 4:26

Extended version bonus tracks 
	
"Vampire Voltage No. 6" – 2:20
"Bonfire Blondes" – 2:26
"Half & Half" – 2:21
"Necessary Evil" – 3:35
"Gamma Ray" (video) – 2:54
"Youthless" (video) – 2:51
"Modern Guilt" (video) – 3:14
"Replica" (video) – 3:24

Personnel

Beck – vocals (tracks 1–10), guitars (tracks 1–2, 4–5, 7–10), flute (track 1), percussion (track 1), electric piano (tracks 2, 7–8), bass guitar (tracks 4, 7–10), marimba (track 7), tambourine (track 8), slide guitar (track 9) 
Brian LeBarton – synthesizer (tracks 1, 5)
Jason Falkner – bass guitar (tracks 1, 3), guitar (track 3)
Chan Marshall – vocals (tracks 1, 6)
Danger Mouse – beats (tracks 1–2, 4–7, 9–10), keyboard bass (tracks 2, 6–7), synthesizer (track 6), programming (track 6), sounds (track 8)
Greg Kurstin – organ (track 3), piano (tracks 3–4, 7), synthesizer (track 5)
Joey Waronker – drums (track 3)
Matt Mahaffey – bass guitar (track 5)
Larry Corbett – cello (track 5)
Drew Brown – beat (track 8)

Technical
Danger Mouse – co-producer
Beck – co-producer, album design
Drew Brown – engineer
Darrell Thorp – additional engineering, co-mixing (track 3)
Kennie Takahashi – mixing
Wes Seidman – assistant engineer
Seth Waldmann – assistant engineer
Eric Weaver – assistant engineer
Sam Holland – assistant engineer
Dror Mohar – assistant engineer
Danny Kalb – assistant engineer
Todd Monfalcone – assistant engineer
Nathalie Marchand – additional assistance
Bob Ludwig – mastering
David Campbell – string arrangements, conductor
Drew Brown – photos, album design
David Calderley – layout

Accolades

Charts and certifications

Weekly charts

Year-end charts

Release history

References

External links
http://www.modernguilt.com

2008 albums
Beck albums
Albums arranged by David Campbell (composer)
Albums produced by Danger Mouse (musician)
Interscope Records albums
XL Recordings albums
Albums produced by Beck
Psychedelic rock albums by American artists
Avant-pop albums